State Route 132 (SR 132) is a state highway in the U.S. state of California that connects the Central Valley with the Sierra Nevada foothills and the California Gold Country. Its western segment also connects the city of Modesto with the San Francisco Bay Area via I-580, although this route is discouraged due to it being a two-lane road between Modesto and Interstate 5 (motorists are instead encouraged to take SR 120 in Manteca to I-5 and I-205 to I-580). East of Modesto, the road climbs the foothills and eventually ends at SR 49 at Coulterville.

Route 132 is a two-lane road important to recreational travelers en route to Modesto Reservoir, Turlock Reservoir, Don Pedro Reservoir and the Sierra Nevada foothills.

Route description
The route begins in San Joaquin County at Interstate 580, heading eastward as a freeway. After an interchange with Interstate 5, the freeway segment ends and continues as a two-lane highway. After passing SR 33 at an interchange, it enters Stanislaus County, where it intersects CR J3. It then heads eastward, then turns north on Dakota Avenue for a short length before turning east onto a two-lane expressway through the city of Modesto, where it intersects SR 99 and SR 108. At the east side of the city, it has a very short concurrency with CR J7 as it exits Modesto and enters Empire. As it exits Empire, it intersects numerous county roads as it exits Stanislaus County and enters Tuolumne County. After several miles, it exits Tuolumne County and enters Mariposa County, California, reaching its east end at SR 49 in Coulterville. 

SR 132 is part of the California Freeway and Expressway System, and west of the eastern Modesto city limits is part of the National Highway System, a network of highways that are considered essential to the country's economy, defense, and mobility by the Federal Highway Administration.

History
The route was established in 1934 from modern day SR 33 to SR 49; in 1959 it was extended west to I-5, and in 1963 to the present-day western terminus at I-580.

A major accident occurred on March 5, 1983, when a collision involving a patrol car and another car with three Secret Service agents inside occurred, killing all three Secret Service agents. This was due to the unusual curve that the road takes on near the end of its course in Mariposa County, created in order to support the hills of the Sierra Nevada. The patrol car was hired for a visit that Queen Elizabeth II was planning to Yosemite National Park in March 1983.

The city-built "Kansas-Needham Overhead", connecting Kansas Avenue and Needham Street over the Union Pacific Railroad's Fresno Subdivision in Modesto, was aligned for a future connection to a SR 132 expressway west of Modesto. Construction of the first phase of the expressway project began in 2019 and was completed in September 2022. The new alignment starts at the intersection of Maze Boulevard (SR 132) and Dakota Avenue where SR 132 travels north on Dakota for a short distance and then turns east onto a newly-built two-lane expressway to SR 99 and Needham Street, where SR 132 then travels southeast on new one-way auxiliary roadways of 5th and 6th Streets alongside SR 99 (though it is not co-routed) to the interchange of Maze Boulevard, meeting up with SR 108 and SR 132's present day alignment.

Future
A second phase of the SR 132 expressway project west of Modesto is in the proposal stage. It is planned to connect to the recently completed expressway at Dakota Avenue to an approximate location near the intersection of Maze Boulevard (SR 132) and Gates Road / Paradise Road.

Major intersections

See also

References

External links

California @ AARoads.com - State Route 132
Caltrans: Route 132 highway conditions
California Highways: SR 132

132
State Route 132
State Route 132
State Route 132
State Route 132
Transportation in Modesto, California
132